The 2019–20 Santosh Trophy would have been the 74th edition of the Santosh Trophy, the premier competition in India for teams representing their regional and state football associations.
It was cancelled due to COVID-19 pandemic.

Services are the defending champions, having defeated Punjab in the final during the 2018–19 season.

Qualifiers

The following teams have qualified:

 Delhi 
 Goa 
 Jharkhand
 Karnataka
 Kerala 
 Meghalaya 
 Mizoram
 Punjab 
 Services 
 West Bengal

Group stage

Group A

Group B

Knockout stage

Semi-finals

Final

References

External links
 Santosh Trophy on the All India Football Federation website .

 
Santosh Trophy seasons